Seh Darreh may refer to:
 Seh Darreh, Arsanjan, Fars Province
 Seh Darreh, Jahrom, Fars Province
 Seh Darreh, Kerman
 Seh Darreh, Zanjan